Silvia Prieto is a 1999 Argentine drama and comedy film directed by Martín Rejtman. The musical score was composed by Vicentico. The film stars Rosario Bléfari, Valeria Bertuccelli, Vicentico, Marcelo Zanelli, Susana Pampín, Luis Mancini and Mirta Busnelli.

In 2022, it was selected as the ninth greatest film of Argentine cinema in a poll organized in 2022 by the specialized magazines La vida útil, Taipei and La tierra quema, which was presented at the Mar del Plata International Film Festival.

Cast
 Rosario Bléfari
 Valeria Bertuccelli
 Vicentico
 Marcelo Zanelli
 Susana Pampín
 Luis Mancini
 Mirta Busnelli
 Marta Albertinazzi
 Cecilia Biagini
 Guillermina Casey
 Gabo Correa
 Daniela Cugliandolo
 Pablo Córdoba

References

External links
 
 

1990s Spanish-language films
1999 films
1999 comedy-drama films
Films shot in Argentina
Films directed by Martín Rejtman
Argentine comedy-drama films
1990s Argentine films